The Șucu (in its upper course also: Șuculețu) is a left tributary of the river Bistra Mărului in Romania. It flows into the Bistra Mărului in Poiana Mărului.

References

Rivers of Romania
Rivers of Caraș-Severin County